The Unattractive Revolution is the second studio album by Swedish glam metal band Crashdïet. Released on 3 October 2007, it debuted at #11 on the Swedish album charts. It was the first and only album to feature vocalist H. Olliver Twisted following the death of Dave Lepard.

Track listing

Personnel
 H. Olliver Twisted – vocals
 Martin Sweet – guitar
 Peter London – bass
 Eric Young – drums

Additional musicians
 Mick Mars – lead guitar on tracks "I Don't Care" and "Alone"

Chart positions

Album

Singles

References

External links 
 Crashdїet official website

2007 albums
Crashdïet albums